Manuel José Leonardo Arce Leal  (1935–1985) was a Guatemalan poet and dramatist.

Manuel José Leonardo Arce Leal was born in Guatemala City in 1935. Poet and dramatist, he was considered one of the most relevant national writers of the second half of the 20th century.  He was awarded important Central American prizes and his works have been translated into many languages.

In the 1980s he had to flee Guatemala under the constant threats of Romeo Lucas García's regime.  While he was in France, many of the worst massacres of his homeland occurred under the governments of Lucas García and Efraín Ríos Montt.  In response, Arce wrote some very strong poems against Efraín Ríos Montt, which were later censured.  He died of pulmonary cancer while in exile in France on September 22, 1985.

Works

Poetry 
 En el nombre del Padre, 1955
 De la posible aurora [Sonetos a mi esposa], 1957
 Cantos en vida, 1960
 Eternauta: cantos de un mar, 1962
 Los episodios del vagón de carga (anti-pop-emas), 1971
 Palabras alusivas al acto y otros poemas con el tema del amor, 1953-1978, 1978
 Poemas póstumos, 1987

Narrative 
 Diario de un escribiente Tomo 1, 1979
 Diario de un escribiente Tomo 2, 1987
 De una ciudad y otros asuntos: crónica fidedigna, 1992

Plays 
 Delito condena y ejecución de una gallina y otras piezas de teatro grotesco, 1971
 Diálogo del gordo y el flaco con una rocola.
 El gato que murió de histeria.
 Compermiso.
 Sebastián sale de compras.
 Torotumbo (adaption of novel by Miguel Ángel Asturias).

References
This article was initially translated from the Spanish Wikipedia.

20th-century Guatemalan poets
20th-century male writers
Guatemalan male poets
Guatemalan dramatists and playwrights
Male dramatists and playwrights
1935 births
1985 deaths
20th-century dramatists and playwrights